The following radio stations broadcast on AM frequency 660 kHz: 660 AM is a United States clear-channel frequency. WFAN New York City and KFAR Fairbanks, Alaska, share Class A status of 660 kHz.

In Argentina 
 LT41 in Gualeguaychu, Entre Rios

In Canada 
 CFFR in Calgary, Alberta - 50 kW 24-hour, transmitter located at

In Chile 
 CB-66 in Santiago (Radio UC, formerly Radio Cooperativa, and before 2005 Radio Chilena) - this station was heard across most of Latin America.

In Colombia 
 HJQS in Cúcuta
 HJR29 in San Andrés
 HJEZ in Santiago de Cali

In Mexico 
 XECPR-AM in Felipe Carrillo Puerto, Quintana Roo
 XEDTL-AM in San Lorenzo Tezonco, Mexico City
 XEEY-AM in El Sauz II, Aguascalientes
 XEFZ-AM in San Nicolás de los Garza, Nuevo León
 XESJC-AM in San José del Cabo, Baja California Sur
 XEYG-AM in Matias Romero, Oaxaca

In the United States 
Stations in bold are clear-channel stations.

External links

 FCC list of radio stations on 660 kHz

References

Lists of radio stations by frequency